McElreath is a surname. Notable people with the surname include:

 Jim McElreath (1928–2017), American racing driver in the USAC and CART 
 Richard McElreath (born 1973), American professor of anthropology
 Walter McElreath (1867–1951), American lawyer, legislator, and bank executive